Berea is an unincorporated community in Houston County, Texas.  It is located at the intersection of Texas State Highway 7 and Farm to Market Road 232.  It has a population of 41.

References

Unincorporated communities in Houston County, Texas
Unincorporated communities in Texas